Denise Provence (1921–2011) was a French stage, film and television actress.

Selected filmography
 Branquignol (1949)
 The Paris Waltz (1950)
 The Turkey (1951)
 A Love Under an Umbrella (1951)
 The Turkey (1951)
 A Caprice of Darling Caroline (1953)
 The Porter from Maxim's (1953)
 Les Truands (1956)
 Winter Holidays (1959)
 The Lions Are Loose (1961)
 Landru (1963)
 Angélique, Marquise des Anges (1964)
 Jealous as a Tiger (1964)
 Marvelous Angelique (1965)
 The Legend of Frenchie King (1971)
 The Mad Adventures of Rabbi Jacob (1973)

References

Bibliography
 Klossner, Michael. The Europe of 1500-1815 on Film and Television: A Worldwide Filmography of Over 2550 Works, 1895 Through 2000. McFarland & Company, 2002.

External links

1921 births
2011 deaths
French film actresses
French television actresses
French stage actresses
Actresses from Paris